Elections were held in Illinois on Tuesday, November 3, 1964.

Primaries were held on April 14, 1964.

Election information

Turnout
In the primary, turnout was 41.74% with 2,154,941 ballots cast (1,062,320 Democrat and 1,092,621 Republican).

In the general election, turnout was 86.67% with 4,796,641 ballots cast.

Federal elections

United States President 

Illinois voted for the Democratic ticket of Lyndon B. Johnson and Hubert Humphrey.

United States House 

All 24 Illinois seats in the United States House of Representatives were up for election in 1964.

Democrats flipped one seat, leaving the Illinois House delegation to consist of 13 Democrats and 11 Republicans.

State elections

Governor

Incumbent Governor Otto Kerner, Jr., a Democrat, won reelection.

Lieutenant Governor

Incumbent Lieutenant Governor Samuel H. Shapiro, a Democrat, won reelection to a second term.

Democratic primary

Republican primary

General election

Attorney General 

 
Incumbent Attorney General William G. Clark, a Democrat, was reelected to a second term.

Democratic primary

Republican primary

General election

Secretary of State 

The incumbent Secretary of State was William H. Chamberlain, a Democrat appointed in 1964. He did not seek reelection. Democrat Paul Powell was elected to succeed him in office.

Democratic primary

Republican primary

General election

Auditor of Public Accounts 

Incumbent Auditor of Public Accounts Michael Howlett, a Democrat, was reelected to a second term, defeating Republican challenger John Kirby.

Democratic primary
Howlett won the Democratic primary unopposed.

Republican primary
John Kirby won the Republican primary.

Candidates
John William Chapman, former Lieutenant Governor
Maurice W. Coburn, 1962 Illinois Treasurer candidate, former administrative assistant to the Governor of Illinois (1956–1960), chairman of the Illinois Veterans League, 44th Ward Precinct Captain, former President of the Young Conservative Club, lawyer
Louis "Lou" Haenle
James P. Hennessy
Gordon E. Kerr, Illinois State Senator 
John Kirby
Walter E. McCarron, Cook County Coroner
Sherwin Willens, businessman

Results

General election

State Senate
Seats of the Illinois Senate were up for election in 1964. Republicans retained control of the chamber.

State House of Representatives
All 177 seats in the Illinois House of Representatives were up for election in 1964. In an unusual twist, the state of Illinois was unable to pass a redistricting map. As a result, as stipulated in the state Constitution all candidates were elected at large on one ballot, which contained 236 names and spread 33 inches long. Both the Democrats and the Republicans nominated 118 candidates.  Voters could either voter for up to 177 candidates, and a straight-ticket option was also available.

Every Democratic candidate won, flipping the chamber and giving Democrats a super-majority in the state House. Democrats won a total of 118 seats to Republican's 59 seats.

Trustees of University of Illinois

An election was held for three of nine seats for Trustees of University of Illinois. 

The election saw the reelection of first term Democratic incumbent Howard Clement, second-term Democratic incumbent Harold Pogue, as well as fellow Democratic incumbent Theodore A. Jones (who had been appointed to fill a vacancy in 1963).

Ballot measures
Two ballot measures were put before voters in 1966, both of them legislatively referred constitutional amendments.

In order to be placed on the ballot, proposed legislatively referred constitutional amendments needed to be approved by two-thirds of each house of the Illinois General Assembly. In order to be approved, they required approval of either two-thirds of those voting on the amendment itself or a majority of all ballots cast in the general elections.

Annual Legislative Sessions Amendment 
The Annual Legislative Sessions Amendment, a legislatively referred constitutional amendment, was put to a vote. It would have amended Section 9 of Article IV of the Illinois Constitution. It failed to meet either threshold for passage.

Continuity of Governmental Operations in Periods of Emergency Amendment 
The Continuity of Governmental Operations in Periods of Emergency Amendment, a legislatively referred constitutional amendment, was put to a vote. It would have amended Section 35 of Article IV of the Illinois Constitution. It failed to meet either threshold for passage.

Local elections
Local elections were held.

References

 
Illinois